KYAL may refer to:

 KYAL (AM), a radio station (1550 AM) licensed to Sapulpa, Oklahoma, United States
 KYAL-FM, a radio station (97.1 FM) licensed to Muskogee, Oklahoma, United States